The South Africa men's national under-18 ice hockey team is the men's national under-18 ice hockey team of South Africa. The team is controlled by the South African Ice Hockey Association, a member of the International Ice Hockey Federation. The team represents South Africa at the IIHF World U18 Championships.

International competitions

IIHF Asian Oceanic U18 Championships

1999: 2nd in Division II (6th overall)

IIHF World U18 Championships

External links
South Africa at IIHF.com

National under-18 ice hockey teams
ice hockey